The Mayoral election of 1957 in Pittsburgh, Pennsylvania was held on Tuesday, November 5, 1957. The incumbent mayor, David Lawrence of the Democratic Party won an unprecedented fourth term. Lawrence defeated former Court of Common Pleas Judge John Drew. For the third straight election, the powerful mayor gained quiet support from the Republican business community for his urban renewal projects, which compromised the GOP candidate's position.

Results

References

1957 Pennsylvania elections
1957 United States mayoral elections
1957
1950s in Pittsburgh
November 1957 events in the United States